Pechino Express is the Italian TV version of the reality show Peking Express created by Ludo Poppe.  It has been broadcast on Rai 2 from 2012 to 2020 and on Sky Uno since 2022.

Seasons

Winning couple, runner up and third placed

RAI original programming
2012 Italian television series debuts
Italian reality television series